USS Satterlee (DD-190) was a  in the United States Navy, entering service in 1919. After brief service until 1922, the ship was placed in reserve. The ship was reactivated for World War II before being transferred to the Royal Navy in 1940. Renamed HMS Belmont, the destroyer was used as a convoy escort in the Battle of the Atlantic where she was torpedoed and sunk on 31 January 1942.

Construction
The Clemson-class was a modified version of the previous  (itself a faster version of the ) with more fuel, as many of the Wickes-class had poor fuel economy and hence endurance. Like the Wickes-class ships, the Clemsonss had flush-decks and four funnels and were ordered in very large numbers to meet the US Navy's need for ships to counter German U-boats as well as to operate with the fleet.

Displacement was  normal and  full load. Four White-Forster water-tube boilers supplied steam to two sets of Westinghouse geared steam turbines.

Main gun armament consisted of four  /50 caliber guns, with one forward and one aft on the ship's centerline, and the remaining two on the ships beam. Anti-aircraft armament consisted of two 3"/23 caliber guns, while torpedo armament consisted of twelve 21 inch (533 mm) torpedo tubes, arranged in four triple mounts on the ship's beams.

Saterlee was the first ship named for Captain Charles Satterlee USCG (1875–1918), captain of the US Coast Guard cutter , who was killed when Tampa was sunk by a German submarine on 26 September 1918. The ship was laid down on 10 July 1918 at the Newport News Shipbuilding & Dry Dock Company, Newport News, Virginia shipyard and was launched on 21 December 1918. The ship was sponsored by Ms. Rebecca E. Satterlee, niece of the ship's namesake. The destroyer was commissioned on 23 December 1919.

Service

United States Navy service
Satterlee joined her destroyer flotilla at Manzanillo, Cuba on 27 January 1920 and conducted training in the Caribbean until 26 April. She then carried out further trials and underwent defect rectification before rejoining her flotilla at Naval Station Newport, the naval base on Newport, Rhode Island, on 11 June. Saterlee attended that year's America's Cup yachting races off New York City from 9–26 July, and visited Miami from 2–28 August before resuming training off Newport. On 27 December that year, three of the ship's crew absconded with $72,000 which had been delivered to the ship earlier that day. The three men were subsequently arrested and convicted of the theft, being sentenced to a five year prison sentence. The destroyer joined the Atlantic Fleet at Guantanamo Bay on 10 January 1921 to take part in the fleet maneuvers which continued until 24 April. She then resumed training and upkeep along the Atlantic coast until she was decommissioned on 11 July 1922 and placed in reserve at Philadelphia.

With war breaking out in both Europe and the Far East, Satterlee was recommissioned at Philadelphia on 18 December 1939 and assigned to duty on Neutrality Patrol. She arrived in the Caribbean on 2 February 1940 for patrol duty and training. The ship departed the Caribbean on 15 April, and underwent overhaul at Norfolk, Virginia from 19 April – 5 July. She then operated along the east coast until decommissioned on 8 October.

Royal Navy service
Satterlee was transferred to the United Kingdom on the same day and served the Royal Navy as HMS Belmont, one of 50 old American destroyers exchanged for bases in British colonies in the western Atlantic.

HMS Belmont was commissioned on 8 October 1940, and sailed for Britain on 15 October. Belmont reached Belfast, Northern Ireland, on 24 October and reaching Devonport on 28 October, where she underwent a refit, completed on 25 November that year. She joined the 3d Escort Group in the Western Approaches Command and conducted escorting duty for Atlantic convoys, broken only for repairs of collision damage between March and July 1941. While under the command of Lt. Cdr. G. B. O. Harding RN on 31 January 1942, she was struck by a single torpedo south of Newfoundland in position 42º02'N, 57º18'W, and sunk with the loss of all 138 hands by the German U-boat  (commanded by Lt. Cdr. Rollmann) while escorting a convoy (NA.2) of British and Canadian airmen to the United Kingdom.

The names of her crew are commemorated on the Portsmouth Naval Memorial at Southsea Common, Southsea, Hampshire, UK.

References

External links

navsource.org: USS Satterlee
hazegray.org: USS Satterlee

 

Clemson-class destroyers
Ships built in Newport News, Virginia
1918 ships
Ships transferred from the United States Navy to the Royal Navy
Town-class destroyers of the Royal Navy
Town-class destroyers converted from Clemson-class destroyers
World War II destroyers of the United Kingdom
Ships sunk by German submarines in World War II
World War II shipwrecks in the Atlantic Ocean
Maritime incidents in January 1942
Warships lost in combat with all hands

sl:USS George E. Badger (DD-196)